Journey to the Center of the Earth is a 2008 American-Canadian television action adventure film directed by T. J. Scott and starring Rick Schroder, Victoria Pratt, and Peter Fonda. The film is very loosely based on the 1864 novel of the same name by Jules Verne. It was shot in HD on location in and around Vancouver in the summer of 2007, and first aired on Ion Television on January 27, 2008.  It has since been released on DVD.

Plot
Heiress Martha Dennison seeks out professor Jonathan Brock to help find her husband, Edward, who disappeared four years earlier on an expedition towards the center of the Earth. At first Jonathan is hesitant to go despite Martha's offer to handsomely pay him, giving him the opportunity to pay off the debts left to him by his recently deceased father, while his nephew and aspiring journalist Abel is excited for the opportunity to get real life journalistic experience.  After reviewing Edward's notes Jonathan is persuaded to go along.  The two of them, along with Abel, go to the newly acquired Alaskan territory to gather information about Edward and his expedition and find a Russian guide, Sergei, to aide their search of her husband.  They struggle to cover a large amount of ground in only 10 days based upon information recovered from a crudely drawn map.  They find and enter a mine shaft in a volcano, venturing deep into the center of the earth.  Along the way small signs are found of the previous expedition along with the skeleton of Mikael, a friend like a brother to Sergei, and see it as an ominous sign of what's ahead.  Abel constantly lags behind taking notes and pictures of the journey and discovers a passage to a strange new land.

They come out into a world that, at first, seems much like the surface except that it never gets dark despite there being no sun with a lush forest land and a large lake-like sea. Soon they encounter many prehistoric creatures and the adventure really begins.  While Martha takes a bath and short swim she is attacked by some sort of creature in the sea, at the same time Jonathan and Sergei find some logs that were clearly cut down by a person using an axe to make a raft to cross the sea. They use the left over logs and their supply of rope to make a raft of their own and notice several dinosaur-like birds (Archaeopteryx) flying above their heads in a vulture like fashion. As some of the birds move into attack they notice a very, very large pliosaur in the water heading for their raft. Jonathan suggests shooting the birds to distract and accidentally feed the dangerous and lethal marine reptile in the water.

They then discuss the nature of the creatures that they encountered noting that they seem to have come from different eras of development and may have escaped to this region to survive Ice Ages and other dinosaur-killing phenomena.  They then find another damaged raft, believed to be Edward's, and decide to make camp.  While Abel goes exploring alone, Sergei reveals to Jonathan that he did not go along with Edward when he first came to Alaska because he did not trust him and blames himself for not stopping Mikael from joining the expedition that led to his death.  Abel encounters two native women in the forest and he gathers the rest to follow a trail that may lead them to more answers.

While crossing a rather well-made bridge a group of hostile natives surround them and bring them to their village to meet their leader who is Edward himself, who acts rather coldly towards them and forces them to bow and give up their weapons as a native custom.  Edward elaborates the nature of his conditions, that the villagers believe him to be some kind of a god who has brought them prosperity and safety by sharing his wisdom which are actually ideas of indigenous survival he got from studying other civilizations.  In a private discussion with him, Martha admits that she was expecting him to be more happy to see her; he then admits that he had never expected her to come for him and intends to stay there where he has power and influence compared to the world above where he found her power threatening.  Edward makes a pass at Martha and she rebuffs him and he goes to the village priestess whom he regards as a new wife. While they are talking a group of natives join forces and free some prisoners.  When Edward leaves his tent and finds these people he begins to shoot at them and kills one young man in front of all the others claiming that he is a traitor.  Martha slaps him causing him to bleed planting seeds of doubt that he is a god; he then explains that their leader (who escaped with help from Jonathan) has doubted Edward from the start and started a resistance to his rule and that the presence of the renegades has undercut Edward's power and so the resistance must be destroyed.  Martha explains that Edward has always been this way and that his arrogance is what attracted her to him in the first place.

Edward then loses his power and influence over the tribe as he has been revealed to be a false god and all of the villagers leave him.  He then leaves all of his village gear behind and states that they must now leave and that their raft has been destroyed so they must take an ancient passage; meanwhile the resistance is hot on their trail to stop them.  When the resistance advances upon them Edward holds out a single piece of dynamite to ward off their attacks and when they reach the cave he lights the dynamite with the hope that it will seal the entrance to the cave that leads to the surface.  When it fails to ignite, Edward leaves the cave and shoots the dynamite sealing the rest of the group in, and him out with the violent resistance.  The team then struggles through water filled passages that lead them up through to the lake on the surface, where they originally found the entrance to the cave.

On the surface they make a small memorial for Edward, who is presumed dead, and decide not to tell the secret of the world below, and to continue their adventures to the East Indies with Martha and Jonathan (most unpredictably) as an item.  Abel then writes at the end of his diary that everything he has written and drawn about is only a figment of his imagination so as to discredit their discoveries.

Cast
 Rick Schroder as Jonathan Brock
 Victoria Pratt as Martha Dennison 
 Peter Fonda as Edward Dennison
 Steven Grayhm as Abel Brock
 Mike Dopud as Sergei
 Elyse Levesque as Emily

External links
 
 Journey to the Center of the Earth on RHI Entertainment
 Journey to the Center of the Earth on Hallmark Channel

2008 television films
2008 films
2008 science fiction action films
2008 fantasy films
2000s action adventure films
2000s American films
2000s Canadian films
2000s fantasy adventure films
2000s science fiction adventure films
Action television films
Adventure television films
American action adventure films
American fantasy adventure films
American science fiction television films
Canadian action adventure films
Canadian fantasy adventure films
Canadian science fiction television films
English-language Canadian films
Films based on Journey to the Center of the Earth
Films directed by T. J. Scott
Films set in Alaska
Films shot in Vancouver
Sonar Entertainment films
Television films based on books

ja:センター・オブ・ジ・アース ワールド・エンド